is a town located in Chiba Prefecture, Japan. , the town had an estimated population of 6,754 in 2976 households and a population density of 140 persons per km².

Geography 
Located in the mountainous area that divides the center of Bōsō Peninsula, Nagara has little flat terrain. The town consists primarily of rolling, sometimes steep, hills. While the town has no major rivers, several dams, including the Nagara Dam, have been constructed to support the water sources of the Bōsō Peninsula. Nagara is located about 25 kilometers from the prefectural capital at Chiba and within 50 to 60 kilometers from the center of Tokyo.

Neighboring municipalities 
Chiba Prefecture
 Ichihara
 Mobara
 Chōnan

Climate
Nagara has a humid subtropical climate (Köppen Cfa) characterized by warm summers and cool winters with light to no snowfall.  The average annual temperature in Nagara is 14.8 °C. The average annual rainfall is 1639 mm with September as the wettest month. The temperatures are highest on average in August, at around 25.7 °C, and lowest in January, at around 4.8 °C.

Demographics
Per Japanese census data, the population of Nagara has declined in recent decades.

History
Nagara is part of ancient Kazusa Province. The village of Nagara was established with the creation of the modern municipalities system on April 1, 1889. Nagara was raised to town status in 1955 by merging with the neighboring village of Hiyoshi, and part of the village of Mizukami.

Economy
The primary economic activities are agriculture and golf courses.

Government
Nagara has a mayor-council form of government with a directly elected mayor and a unicameral town council of 12 members. Together with the other municipalities of Chōsei District, Nagara contributes one member to the Chiba Prefectural Assembly. In terms of national politics, the town is part of Chiba 11th district of the lower house of the Diet of Japan.

Education
Nagara has two public elementary schools and one public middle school operated by the town government. The town does not have a high school.

Transportation

Railways 
Nagara is not served by any passenger train lines. The closest train station to Nagara is the Sotobō Line at Mobara Station.

Bus service 
Kominato Bus, a service of the Kominato Railway Company.

Highways 
Nagara is not located on any national highway.
Prefectural Route 13, Ichihara-Mobara
Prefectural Route 14, Chiba-Mobara

Local attractions 
 Gensō-ji
 Nagara cave tombs, National Historic Site
 Nagara Dam
 Japan Aerobics Center

Notable people from Nagara 
 Minoru Ōta, admiral of the Imperial Japanese Navy
 Shibata Ainosuke, action-film actor

References

External links

Official Website 

Towns in Chiba Prefecture
Nagara, Chiba